Alfajor Castañeda also called alfajor king kong is a traditional alfajor of the Peruvian city Trujillo located in the north coast of Peru. It is made since 1925 by the company Dulcería Castañeda, one of the ten top brands in the city. The product is one of the in old times called Alfajor de Trujillo a traditional candy of the city.

Ingredients
For mass
It is used in the preparation flour, eggs, margarine, salt, water.

For filling
It is used in the preparation for the filling: figs, quince, walnuts, blancmange.

Related products
Trujillo (beer)
Alfajor de Trujillo

See also
Gastronomic Fair in Trujillo
Marinera Festival
Trujillo Spring Festival

References

External links

Location of Trujillo city (Wikimapia)
Alfajor Castañeda

Media
Gallery of images
Cultural Promotion Center of Trujillo

Cuisine of Trujillo, Peru